Robert Garrison (born Ruben Gerson; 18 July 1872 – died 5 January 1930) was a German-Jewish film actor.

Robert Garrison was born in Strasburg in Westpreußen and died in Berlin.

Selected filmography
 People in Ecstasy (1921)
 The Ancient Law (1923)
 Quarantäne (1923)
 Debit and Credit (1924)
 Michael (1924)
 Dudu, a Human Destiny (1924)
 Father Voss (1925)
 If You Have an Aunt (1925)
 Slums of Berlin (1925)
 Shadows of the Metropolis (1925)
 Joyless Street (1925)
 The Company Worth Millions (1925)
 The Circus Princess (1925)
 The Humble Man and the Chanteuse (1925)
 Peter the Pirate (1925)
 An Artist of Life (1925)
 The Man Who Sold Himself (1925)
 The Woman with That Certain Something (1925)
 Nick, King of the Chauffeurs (1925)
 Women of Luxury (1925)
 Countess Maritza (1925)
 Tragedy (1925)
 Love's Joys and Woes (1926)
 The Fallen (1926)
 The Young Man from the Ragtrade (1926)
 The Third Squadron (1926)
 The Three Mannequins (1926)
 Countess Ironing-Maid (1926)
 I Liked Kissing Women (1926)
 Watch on the Rhine (1926)
 How Do I Marry the Boss? (1927)
 The Girl from Abroad (1927)
 Klettermaxe (1927)
 Circle of Lovers (1927)
 The Constant Nymph (1928)
 Knights of the Night (1928)
 Master and Mistress (1928)
 Volga Volga (1928)
 Der Herzensphotograph (1928)
 The Insurmountable (1928)
 Tales from the Vienna Woods (1928)
 The Lady from Argentina (1928)
 Today I Was With Frieda (1928)
 Lady in the Spa (1929)
 The Ship of Lost Souls (1929)
 The Gypsy Chief (1929)
 The Daredevil Reporter (1929)
 I Lost My Heart on a Bus (1929)
 Foolish Happiness (1929)
 Yes, Yes, Women Are My Weakness (1929)
 Perjury (1929)
 The Hound of the Baskervilles (1929)
 Grischa the Cook (1929)
 Rivals for the World Record (1930)
 The Woman Without Nerves (1930)
 Busy Girls (1930)
 Police Spy 77 (1930)

References

Bibliography
 Eisner, Lotte H. The Haunted Screen: Expressionism in the German Cinema and the Influence of Max Reinhardt. University of California Press, 2008.

External links

1872 births
1930 deaths
19th-century German Jews
Jewish German male actors
German male film actors
German male silent film actors
20th-century German male actors
People from Brodnica County
People from West Prussia